The 2022 NRLW Premiership was the fifth professional season of Women's rugby league in Australia. The season started on Saturday, 20 August and ran for seven weekends. This comprised five rounds, semi-finals for the top four teams, and a Grand Final that was played on Sunday 2 October as a curtain raiser to the 2022 men's Grand Final. This was the last season before the NRLW goes professional.

Teams 

The Line-up of teams will remain the same as the postponed 2021 season (held from February to April in 2022). The number of teams will raise to 10 in 2023.

Win/loss table
 

 
Bold – Home game
* – Golden point game
Opponent for round listed above margin

Regular season 
The first announcement of the 2022 NRLW season's fixtures was released by the NRL on 8 July 2022.

Matches in rounds 1–3 were played as either curtain raisers or closers to men's matches, or as standalone fixtures. The announcement of Round 4 fixtures was delayed until the NRL placings were known and the four NRL week one finals matches were determined. Round 5 was a triple-header at Central Coast Stadium using the same format as rounds 1 and 2 from the 2021 season.

Round 1

Round 2

Round 3

Round 4

Round 5 

Notes:

Ladder

Ladder progression

Numbers highlighted in green indicate that the team finished the round inside the top four.
Numbers highlighted in blue indicates the team finished first on the ladder in that round.
Numbers highlighted in red indicates the team finished last place on the ladder in that round.

Finals series 
Two semi-finals were played on 25 September 2022 as part of a quadruple-header also featuring the men's and women's Prime Minister's XIII matches against .

The Grand Final was played on Sunday, 2 October 2022, between the winners of the two semi-finals, at Accor Stadium as curtain-raiser to the 2022 men's season grand final.

Grand Final

Team of the week 
At the conclusion of each round, the media department of the NRL announce a team of the week. Seventeen players are named.

Dream Team 
In the week between the Semi-finals and Grand Final, the Rugby League Players Association announced a Dream Team. The team was selected by the players, who each cast one vote for each position.

Individual awards

Dally M Medal Awards Night
The following awards were presented at the Dally M Medal Awards ceremony in Sydney on the night of 28 September.

Dally M Medal Player of the Year: Raecene McGregor ( Sydney Roosters)

Captain of the Year: Isabelle Kelly ( Sydney Roosters)

Coach of the Year: John Strange ( Sydney Roosters)

Provan-Summons Medal: Toni Hunt ( Brisbane Broncos)

Rookie of the Year: Jesse Southwell ( Newcastle Knights)

Try of the Year: Tarryn Aiken for  Brisbane Broncos versus Sydney Roosters (27 August 2022).

Tackle of the Year: Tarryn Aiken for  Brisbane Broncos on Jessica Sergis of the Sydney Roosters (27 August 2022).

RLPA Players' Champion Awards 
The following awards were voted for by NRLW players at the end of the season.

The Players' Champion: Raecene McGregor ( Sydney Roosters

Rookie of the Year:  Gayle Broughton ( Parramatta Eels)

Dennis Tutty Award: Hannah Southwell ( Newcastle Knights)

Statistical Awards
Highest Point Scorer in Regular-season: Zahara Temara ( Sydney Roosters) 44 (1t 20g)

Top Try Scorers in Regular-season: Jayme Fressard ( Sydney Roosters) 5

Players and transfers

Player signings for the 2022 season began in May 2022.

Table last updated: 21 July 2022.

References

External links 
 

 
NRL Women
NRL Women